Jochen Haug (born 11 January 1973) is a German politician for the Alternative for Germany (AfD) and since 2017 member of the Bundestag.

Life and politics

Haug was born 1973 in the West German town of Aulendorf. He studied law at the University of Tübingen to become a lawyer.

Haug became member of the Bundestag after the 2017 German federal election.

Since November 2019 Haug is member of the party executive committee (German: 'Beisitzer') of the AfD.

References

1973 births
Living people
People from Aulendorf
Members of the Bundestag for the Alternative for Germany
Members of the Bundestag for North Rhine-Westphalia
Members of the Bundestag 2017–2021
University of Tübingen alumni
Members of the Bundestag 2021–2025